General Villegas Airport  is an airport serving the town of General Villegas in the Buenos Aires Province of Argentina.

The airport has crossing runways. The asphalt Runway 03/21 is marked closed. The  grass Runway 13/31 is marked closed as of 11/17/2016. Google Earth Historical Imagery shows the runway was closed sometime after 3/4/2016 due to flooding in its central section.

See also

Transport in Argentina
List of airports in Argentina
Talk:General Villegas Airport

References

External links
OpenStreetMap - General Villegas
OurAirports - General Villegas Airport

Airports in Argentina